The third round of the 2019 AFC Asian Cup qualification was played from 26 March 2017 to 27 March 2018.

Format
A total of 24 teams (16 teams which advanced from the second round and eight teams which advanced from the play-off round) compete in the third round to compete for the final 12 slots in the 2019 AFC Asian Cup. Since the hosts United Arab Emirates advanced to the third round of the 2018 FIFA World Cup qualification, the automatic slot for the hosts is no longer necessary.

The 24 teams were divided into six groups of four teams to play home-and-away round-robin matches. The top two teams of each group qualified for the 2019 AFC Asian Cup, where they were joined by the 12 teams which qualified directly from the second round.

Qualified teams
Teams qualified from second round

Notes

Teams qualified from play-off round

Teams qualified from Solidarity Cup
Due to the withdrawal of Guam and the suspension of Kuwait, the AFC invited both Nepal and Macau, the top two teams of the 2016 AFC Solidarity Cup, to re-enter 2019 AFC Asian Cup qualification as replacements in order to maintain 24 teams in the third round of the competition.

Draw
The draw for the third round was held on 23 January 2017, 16:00 GST (UTC+4), in Abu Dhabi, United Arab Emirates. It was initially scheduled for 18 January 2017, but was delayed.

The 24 teams were drawn into six groups of four. They were seeded using the January 2017 FIFA World Rankings (indicated in parentheses below).

The national teams which eventually qualified are presented in bold.

Schedule
The schedule of each matchday was as follows.

Groups

Group A

Group B

Group C

Group D

Group E

Group F

Goalscorers

Notes

References

External links
, the-AFC.com
AFC Asian Cup UAE 2019, stats.the-AFC.com

Qual3
Qual3
3
March 2017 sports events in Asia
June 2017 sports events in Asia
September 2017 sports events in Asia
October 2017 sports events in Asia
November 2017 sports events in Asia
March 2018 sports events in Asia